The Peel Sessions is an extended play (EP) by the Scottish rock band The Jesus & Mary Chain, released in September 1991 by Strange Fruit. It contains recordings the band made for John Peel's Radio 1 show. It was re-released in 2000 as part of a compilation containing all of the band's Peel sessions.

Critical reception
Trouser Press remarked that the EP is "notable for its first half: a February 1985 document of Psychocandy songs played by the short-lived quartet (with future Primal Scream leader Bobby Gillespie on drums) that originally recorded them." AllMusic called it "their most revealing Peel session ... It proved that their songs had an underlying beauty not always apparent below the usual layers of screeching feedback."

Track listing
All tracks written by Jim Reid and William Reid.

12" (SFPMA 21) and CD (SFPMACD 210) 
"Inside Me" - 3:00
 "The Living End" - 2:15
 "Just Like Honey" - 2:48
 "Fall" - 3:14
 "Happy Place" - 2:20
 "In the Rain (About You)" - 2:30

Notes
Tracks 1 to 3 recorded 3 February 1985
Tracks 4 to 5 recorded 25 November 1986

Personnel

The Jesus and Mary Chain
Jim Reid – vocals, guitar
William Reid – vocals, guitar

Additional personnel
Dale Griffin – producer (tracks 1 to 3)
Mike Engles – engineer (tracks 1 to 3)
Dave Dade – producer (tracks 4 to 6)
Simon Clifford – engineer (tracks 4 to 6)
Don Walker – mastering

References

The Jesus and Mary Chain albums
1990 EPs
Peel Sessions recordings
Live EPs
1990 live albums